On May 2, 2018, suicide bombers attacked the High National Elections Commission (HNEC) in Tripoli, Libya, killing at least 16 people, injuring 20 and setting fire to the building.

Responsibility 
The Islamic State's Tripoli Province claimed responsibility for the attack and declared that it came in response to the recent speech of the group's spokesman to hit election centers and activists.

References 

Mass murder in 2018
Suicide bombings in 2018
21st century in Tripoli, Libya
Crime in Tripoli, Libya
May 2018 events in Africa
Terrorist incidents in Africa in 2018
Terrorist incidents in Libya in 2018
ISIL terrorist incidents in Libya
Islamic terrorist incidents in 2018
2018 murders in Libya